Yukio Ishikawa (born 12 December 1932) is a Japanese athlete. He competed in the men's high jump at the 1956 Summer Olympics.

References

1932 births
Living people
Place of birth missing (living people)
Japanese male high jumpers
Olympic athletes of Japan
Athletes (track and field) at the 1956 Summer Olympics
Asian Games silver medalists for Japan
Asian Games bronze medalists for Japan
Asian Games medalists in athletics (track and field)
Athletes (track and field) at the 1951 Asian Games
Athletes (track and field) at the 1954 Asian Games
Athletes (track and field) at the 1958 Asian Games
Medalists at the 1951 Asian Games
Medalists at the 1954 Asian Games
Medalists at the 1958 Asian Games
Japan Championships in Athletics winners
20th-century Japanese people
21st-century Japanese people